Artificial structures visible from space without magnification include highways, dams, and cities. The Great Wall of China, often cited as the only human-made structure visible from space, is not visible from low Earth orbit without magnification, and even then can be seen only under perfect conditions. On the other hand, the centimetre-band Spaceborne Imaging Radar of STS-59 and STS-68 was able to detect not only the Great Wall but also invisible buried segments of it.

Whether an object is visible depends significantly on the height above sea level from where it is observed.

Examples
Using binoculars, astronauts could even see roads, dams, harbors, even large vehicles such as ships and planes. At night, cities are also easily visible from the higher orbit of the ISS.

Metropolitan areas are clearly visible at night, particularly in industrialized countries, due to a multitude of street lights and other light sources in urban areas (see light pollution).

Cooling pond of Chernobyl

The Greenhouses of Almería

It is sometimes referred to as the "Plastic sea" ("Mar de plástico" in Spanish) due to the high concentration of these greenhouse structures. 

This area produces much of the fruit and vegetables that are sold in the rest of Spain and Europe. Apart from the area depicted in the photo, other zones of the province of Almería (and also the south of Spain) have large concentrations of white-plastic greenhouses too.

Bingham Canyon Mine

The Bingham Canyon Mine, more commonly known as Kennecott Copper Mine, is an open-pit mining operation extracting a large porphyry copper deposit southwest of Salt Lake City, Utah, in the Oquirrh Mountains. The mine is the largest man-made excavation in the world.

Misconceptions

The Great Wall of China
The claim that the Great Wall of China is the only man-made object visible from the Moon or outer space has been debunked many times, but remains a common misconception in popular culture. According to astronauts Eugene Cernan and Ed Lu, the Great Wall is visible from the lower part of low Earth orbit, but only under very favorable conditions.

Different claims were historically made for the factoid that the Great Wall is visible from the Moon. William Stukeley mentioned this claim in his letter dated 1754, and Henry Norman made the same claim in 1895. The issue of "canals" on Mars was prominent in the late 19th century and may have led to the belief that long, thin objects were visible from space. A viewer would need visual acuity 17 000 times better than the norm to see the Great Wall from the Moon.

Theoretical calculation of visibility from the ISS 
The human naked eye has an angular resolution of approximately 280 microradians (μrad) (approx 0.016° or 1 minute of arc), and the ISS targets an altitude of 400 km. Using basic trigonometric relations, this means that an astronaut on the ISS with 20/20 vision could potentially detect objects that are 112 m or greater in all dimensions. However, since this would be at the absolute limit of the resolution, objects on the order of 100 m would appear as unidentifiable specks, if not rendered invisible due to other factors, such as atmospheric conditions or poor contrast.

See also
First images of Earth from space
Naked-eye planets
Deck the Halls, a 2006 film that features a man who attempts to get his Christmas lights display visible from space

Notes

External links 
 Gateway to Astronaut Photography of Earth

Urban legends
Megastructures